Vaucluse is a commune in the Doubs department in the Bourgogne-Franche-Comté region in eastern France.

Geography 
It is mountainous, with the valley of the Dessoubre on the east.

Population

See also
 Communes of the Doubs department

References

External links

 Vaucluse on the regional Web site 

Communes of Doubs